The 1916 Denver Pioneers football team represented the University of Denver as a member of the Rocky Mountain Conference (RMC) during the 1916 college football season. In their second season under head coach John Fike, the Pioneers compiled a 4–2–1 record (3–2 against conference opponents), finished third in the RMC, and outscored opponents by a total of 92 to 79.

Schedule

References

Denver
Denver Pioneers football seasons
Denver Pioneers football